William Doughty Andrews Jr. (born June 10, 1945 in Clinton, Louisiana) is a former American football linebacker who played eleven seasons in the National Football League, mainly with the Cleveland Browns.

Andrews scored his only NFL touchdown in the first Monday Night Football game televised by ABC on September 21, 1970. Late in the fourth quarter, Andrews intercepted a pass by the New York Jets' Joe Namath and returned it 25 yards for a touchdown to secure the Browns' 31–21 victory.

He now lives in Bluff Creek, Louisiana, a small community outside of Clinton.

External links
NFL.com player page

References

1945 births
Living people
Players of American football from Louisiana
American football linebackers
Southeastern Louisiana Lions football players
Cleveland Browns players
San Diego Chargers players
Kansas City Chiefs players
People from Clinton, Louisiana